Sedgeford is a village and civil parish in the English county of Norfolk, about 5 miles south of the North Sea and  east of the Wash. It is 36 miles north-west of Norwich. Its area of  had a population, including Fring, of 613 at the 2011 Census. It was estimated at 601 in 2019. For local-government purposes, it falls within the district of King's Lynn and West Norfolk. It lies in a farming valley with main crops of barley, wheat and sugar beat, in a belt of chalk with the small Docking River running through.

History
The villages name probably means "Secci's ford". It is recorded in the Domesday Book of 1086. Part of the church, built of flint and stone, is Anglo-Saxon in origin. It has one of the 124 round towers in Norfolk.

There is archaeological evidence of people living there in much earlier times: remains of Roman villas, pottery, a gold torc from the Iron Age, and Neolithic flint tools found in fields and gardens. Furthermore, it is crossed by two ancient roads, the prehistoric Icknield Way and the Roman-period Peddars Way.

Peddars Way

Peddars Way, an ancient Roman road, runs through the top end of the village and leads directly onto the Norfolk Coast Path. After Fring, the national trail passes through the hamlet of Littleport, a small row of higgledy-piggledy cottages that now forms part of the main village. The route takes walkers past a local landmark, Magazine Cottage, built in the 17th century by the Le Strange family during the civil war as a gunpowder magazine. Legend has it that a secret tunnel ran from the old armoury to the church in the heart of the village. Today this small part of Peddars Way derives its name from this historical building, with Magazine Wood and Magazine Farm just a few steps away. All these properties were once owned by William Newcombe-Baker, a local landowner whose estate covered much of the land round the village. He was a founder member of NORMAC, the Norfolk machinery body that did much in the 20th century to bring modern mechanisation to arable farming in East Anglia. Magazine Wood was rebuilt in 2000. From this high vantage point on Peddars Way, the sun can be seen setting over the sea – one of the few places this is possible on the east coast of Britain.

Peddars Way passes Magazine Wood and crosses the disused West Norfolk Junction Railway. Sedgeford railway station lay on the line between Wells and King's Lynn, but closed to passengers in 1952 and to goods in 1964.

The parish church, Sedgeford St. Mary, is one of 124 round-tower churches in Norfolk.

Archaeological project

The Sedgeford Historical and Archaeological Research Project (SHARP) was established in 1996 to reconstruct the story of human settlement in the parish. Initially, it focused on the Anglo-Saxon cemetery located to the south of the modern village, but it is an ongoing project expanding to many other sites in the parish.

Sports
The village has an associated football team, Sedgeford FC.

Bibliography
Website 1643 Civil War in Lincolnshire and Sir Hamon LeStrange
Neil Faulkner et al., eds, 2014, Digging Sedgeford: A People's Archaeology. Poppyland Publishing. 
Garry Rossin (2018) Sedgeford Aerodrome and the aerial conflict over North West Norfolk during the First World War. Poppyland Publishing.

Notes

http://kepn.nottingham.ac.uk/map/place/Norfolk/Sedgeford

External links

St Mary's on the European Round Tower Churches website
www.sharp.org.uk Sedgeford Historical and Archaeological Research Project
Sedgeford Village Online website

Villages in Norfolk
King's Lynn and West Norfolk
Civil parishes in Norfolk